Lindelani Cyprian Ngidi (born 30 June 1983 in Pietermaritzburg) is a South African slalom canoeist who competed at the international level from 2003 to 2013. He was eliminated in the qualifying round of the C2 event at the 2008 Summer Olympics in Beijing, finishing in 12th place.

Ngidi competed in C1 and C2 classes. His partner in the C2 boat between 2006 and 2008 was Cameron McIntosh. In 2010 he paddled with Siboniso Cele.

World Cup individual podiums

1 African Championship counting for World Cup points

References

1983 births
Sportspeople from Pietermaritzburg
Canoeists at the 2008 Summer Olympics
Living people
Olympic canoeists of South Africa
South African male canoeists
African Games silver medalists for South Africa
African Games medalists in canoeing
Competitors at the 2011 All-Africa Games